The Living Tombstone is an Israeli-American electronic rock band and YouTube channel formed in 2011 by producer Yoav Landau and singer Sam Haft. The group is most notable for their songs and music videos based on video games and pop culture media, such as the Five Nights at Freddy's saga, Overwatch, and My Little Pony, as well as original music. Several of their songs have garnered online virality on social media, and they have been credited with spawning various internet memes. In addition to these videos, they have developed music for the video game In Sound Mind and have created the video game AudioClash: Battle of the Bands. Music publication NME has cited them as "the internet's biggest gaming band."

Career

Background 
The Living Tombstone was founded by musician Yoav Landau in 2011 as both a YouTube channel and musical project. Landau, a native of Israel, was involved in the online fan community of the media franchise My Little Pony, where he created a remix of one of the songs featured on My Little Pony: Friendship is Magic. After the remix garnered several thousand hits, Landau eventually shifted his focus to various video game communities, creating songs based on video games.

Five years after forming The Living Tombstone, Landau moved to the United States where he met vocalist Sam Haft. Haft had previously been involved with other musical projects in the past, such as the comedic music group Sam & Bill. Landau and Haft sent each other their own songs before eventually collaborating together on music, with Haft becoming an official member of The Living Tombstone. The pair wrote original songs such as "Jump Up Superstar" in which Haft contributed backing vocals, and "My Ordinary Life" which was cited by LA Weekly as their most popular song. Both Landau and Haft worked on the worldbuilding for The Living Tombstone, including the characters, story and lore surrounding the group's music and videos. The attention their music received online caused Warner Music to notice the band, and the record label signed The Living Tombstone.

Content and musical style
The Living Tombstone's content consists of both original music and homages to various video games and pop culture media, several of which became popular online. One of the group's first video game-related videos was a trilogy of songs for the first three games in the Five Nights at Freddy's series. The trilogy went viral on YouTube with each song accumulating millions of views; the first video in the series reached over 68 million views by 2016. Houston Press listed the trilogy as one of the best songs based on the horror game. 

In 2018, The Living Tombstone's song based on the hero shooter game Overwatch went viral on social media. Originally released as an animated video from YouTube channel Mashed in January 2017, the song describes two players on the same team arguing about their choice of characters and its contributions to the team's repeated losses, mainly due to the lack of a support character in the team. The song features the refrain "I'm Already Tracer," which became the subject of numerous videos made on social media platform TikTok in which users recorded themselves lip-synching to the song. The meme attracted negative attention as it was the subject of various compilations on social media. Outlets such as Kotaku, Polygon and The Daily Dot noted that such compilations soon became rooted in misogyny, with comments disparaging those who created such videos miming to the song alongside mocking women who play video games in general.

Other songs of theirs that have become viral include their remix of various My Little Pony songs and a remix of "Spooky Scary Skeletons". In 2012, The Living Tombstone remixed the song "Discord" from the Eurobeat producer Odyssey, which accumulated over 40 million views on YouTube and was used in over 500,000 videos on TikTok in 2021. In 2013, Landau made a remix of Andrew Gold's 1996 song "Spooky, Scary Skeletons," which garnered over 90 million views on YouTube. The remix was also listed by The Daily Dot as one of the most popular songs of 2019 on TikTok.

The group's music has been labeled as electronic rock, alternative rock and pop rock, with influences from EDM and Middle Eastern folk music.  Landau has also stated that genres such as complextro, dubstep and drum 'n bass has inspired the band's musical style. Their music and aesthetics have been compared to Gorillaz and Daft Punk, along with Lindsey Stirling's videos.

Game development
The Living Tombstone has also contributed music for video games. In 2021, the band created the soundtrack for the indie horror game In Sound Mind from Israeli game studio We Create Stuff. Their contributions to the soundtrack were praised alongside the game, with several outlets noting that the poignant and reserved compositions added to the dark atmosphere of the game.

In 2021, The Living Tombstone collaborated with game studio Big Boat Interactive to create the music-based strategy game AudioClash: Battle of the Bands. Described as an amalgam of various rhythm games, the role-playing games Pokémon and Dota and the Scott Pilgrim comics, the gameplay consists of assembling a group of musician characters to compete against rival bands. The game was released on Steam in early access in late 2021.

Discography

Albums 
 zero_one (2020)

Notes

References

External links 

Musical groups established in 2011
American electronic rock musical groups
Geek rock groups